Antoni Corone is an American actor and producer. He is perhaps best known for playing "Frank Urbano" in the American drama television series Oz and "Captain Warren" in The Red Road.

Early life 
Corone was born in Willoughby, Ohio.

Career 
Corone launched his career in the mid-1980s, usually cast as rugged, slightly-imposing and domineering types, including club bouncers, security personnel, military men, and officers of the law.

In 1986, Corone played in the television film Charley Hannah. In 1991 he guest-starred in the British television sitcom Only Fools and Horses in the episode Miami Twice playing the role of Mafia don's son Rico Ochetti. The episode originally aired on BBC One in the United Kingdom on December 25, 1991.

In 1997, Corone recorded a participation in Kenan & Kel as the movie star "Buck Savage".

Corone's film work includes bit parts in A-list features such as Blood and Wine, Striptease, Bad Boys II, and Out of Time. He had a larger supporting role in the crime saga We Own the Night.

Corone's other work includes the HBO series Oz (as mobster Frank Urbano), Reservation Road, the 2008 film Recount, the war drama Green Zone, the 2014 TV series The Red Road and 11.22.63 (as Jack Ruby). He also appeared in the 1991 film Cape Fear.

Filmography

Film

Television

References

External links 
 
 Actor Antoni Corone Website

American male film actors
American male television actors
Living people
Place of birth missing (living people)
American producers
Year of birth missing (living people)
Male actors from Ohio
People from Hollywood, Florida
People from Willoughby, Ohio
People from Wickliffe, Ohio